= Pigeon Religion =

American post-punk band

- Origin: Phoenix, Arizona, United States
- Genres: punk-rock
- Years active: 2008-2010
- Labels: Parts Unknown Records, Gilgongo Records, Jarson International Records, Video Disease Records, Drone Errant Records, Smoke And Mirrors Records, Campaign for Infinity
- Members: William Watson, Jes Aurelius
- Past members: Gary Anarchy

Pigeon Religion were an American punk-rock band formed in 2008 in Phoenix, Arizona. Originally, the band consisted of William Watson on bass and vocals, Gary Anarchy on guitar and vocals and Jes Aurelius on drums. After a 2009 Summer West Coast Tour, Gary Anarchy quit the band and left Watson and Aurelius as the principal members, who continued to split all songwriting duties until the band broke up in 2010.

== Live shows ==
Pigeon Religion live shows were notorious for their uncomfortable atmosphere, characterized by violence and excessively loud volume. In their first year of existence, they performed over 100 live shows. An article in the Phoenix New Times mentioned their blitzkrieg promotional tactics.

== Discography ==
=== Studio albums ===
- WHY DO YOU HATE PIGEON RELIGION (Ward-9) (2008)

=== Cassette releases ===
- Live in the E.R. (Smoke And Mirrors) (2008)
- Crystallized Meth PROMO (self released) (2009)
- Warm Insides (Drone Errant) (2010)
- Live at KDVS (Campaign for Infinity) (2010)

=== Singles ===
- Scorpion Milk (Parts Unknown) (2009)
- Dead Boss (Gilgongo / Jarson INTL) (2009)
- Crystallized Meth (Video Disease) (2010)
